Marino, Mariño or Maryino may refer to:

Places
 Marino, Lazio, a town in the province of Rome, Italy
 Marino, South Australia, a suburb of Adelaide
 Marino Conservation Park
 Marino Rocks Greenway, a cycling route
 Marino Rocks railway station
 Marino, County Down in Northern Ireland
 Marino railway station (Northern Ireland) in County Down, Northern Ireland
 Marino railway station, Adelaide in Adelaide, South Australia
 Marino, Dublin, a suburb of Dublin, Ireland
 Marino, Ilinden, North Macedonia
 Maryino District of Moscow, Russia
 Maryino (Moscow Metro), a station of the Moscow Metro

Name
 Marino (name), including people with the surname and given name
 Marino, a thief in the video game Mega Man X: Command Mission
 Marino (comic book), a comic book hero published by Editions Lug
 Marino, a surname of Saint Marina the Monk

Sports
 A.S.D. Città di Marino Calcio or simply Marino, an Italian association football team
 CD Marino, a football team in the Canary Islands, Spain
 Marino de Luanco, a football team in Asturias, Spain
 Yokohama Marinos, a Japanese football team which merged with the Yokohama Flügels to form the Yokohama F. Marinos

Other uses
 Marino language, a language of Vanuatu also known as Sungwadia
 Marino DOC, an Italian wine
 El Marino, a Chilean newspaper
 Palazzo Marino, a 16th-century palace in Milan, Italy

See also
 Toyota Sprinter Marino, a version of the Toyota Corolla car
San Marino (disambiguation)
Mariño
Marinho
Merino (disambiguation)
Marino railway station (disambiguation)